Robert Evans Buswell Jr. is an American academic, author and scholar of Korean Buddhism and Chinese Buddhism as well as Korean religions in general. He is Distinguished Professor of Buddhist Studies at the University of California, Los Angeles and founding director of the Academy of Buddhist Studies (불교 학술원) at Dongguk University, Korea's main Buddhist university.

Education
Buswell began his undergraduate education at the University of California, Santa Barbara and attended between September, 1971 and December, 1972. His focus was Asian Studies. Buswell then left the United States and became a Buddhist monk in Thailand, then Taiwan, and finally The Republic of Korea where he spent five years at Songgwangsa. This experience was related in his book The Zen Monastic Experience:  Buddhist Practice in Contemporary Korea.

He did extensive fieldwork in Buddhist Monasticism between 1972 and 1979 at Wat Bovoranives, Bangkok, Thailand, in 1972 and 1973 on Theravada; at Polam-ji, Landau Island, Hong Kong, in 1973 and 1974 on Ch'an Buddhism; and finally, at Songgwang-sa, Cholla Namdo, Korea, between 1974 and 1979 on Son and Hwaom Buddhism. Returning to the United States, he finished his A.B., with Highest Honors at the University of California, Berkeley in June, 1981.  He earned an M.A., With Distinction, from U.C. Berkeley in 1983, and his Ph.D. also from U.C. Berkeley in December 1985. His dissertation was entitled:"The Korean Origin of the Vajrasamadhi-Sutra: A Case Study in Determining the Dating, Provenance, and Authorship of a Buddhist Apocryphal Scripture."

Although a soft-spoken man, Buswell enjoys the status of a public intellectual.

Career
Buswell was hired by the University of California, Los Angeles and is Distinguished Professor of Korean and Chinese Buddhist Studies, and director of the Center for Buddhist Studies, at UCLA. He simultaneously serves as founding director of the Academy of Buddhist Studies (Pulgyo Haksurwŏn) at Dongguk University, the major Buddhist University in Korea. He has served as the chair of the Asian Languages and Cultures Department (7/1995 to 6/2004), and was the founding director of the Center for Buddhist Studies and the Center for Korean Studies at UCLA. He served as the founding director of the UCLA Center for Korean Studies (5/1993 to 6/2001) and is the current Director of the UCLA Center for Buddhist Studies. He was interim vice-provost and dean of the International Institute (2000–2001) and was elected president of the Association for Asian Studies (2008–09);

He has published fifteen books and roughly forty articles on aspects of the Korean, Chinese and Indian traditions of Buddhism and Korean religions.

Buswell and other noted scholars of Buddhism at UCLA, such as William Bodiford and Gregory Schopen, have made it one of the strongest Buddhist studies programs in the world.

Works
 2016: Numinous Awareness Is Never Dark: The Korean Buddhist Master Chinul’s Excerpts on Zen Practice. Translated, annotated, and with an introduction by Robert E. Buswell Jr.. Honolulu: University of Hawaii Press. 352 pp. 
 2013: The Princeton Dictionary of Buddhism with Donald S. Lopez Jr. Princeton: Princeton University Press, 2013. 1304 pp.
 2007: Cultivating Original Enlightenment: Wŏnhyo's Exposition of the Vajrasamādhi-Sūtra (Kumgang Sammmaegyong Non). The Collected Works of Wonhyo, vol. 1.. Honolulu: University of Hawaii Press, 2007. 429 pp.
 2006: Christianity in Korea. Coeditor (with Timothy S. Lee) and contributor. Honolulu: University of Hawaii Press. 408 pp.

 The Scriptures of Won-Buddhism (Wonbulgyo kyojŏn). Translated by Robert E. Buswell Jr., Nak-chung Paik (Seoul National University) and Young Don Choi (Korea University), on behalf of the Department of Edification of Won-Buddhism. Iksan: Won Kwang Publishing Co.467 pp.
 2005: Currents and Countercurrents: Korean Influences on the Buddhist Traditions of East Asia. Editor and contributor. Honolulu: University of Hawaii Press. 294 pp.
 2004: Encyclopedia of Buddhism. Editor-in-Chief and contributor. 2 vols. New York: Macmillan Reference. 981 + xxxix pp.
 2000: The Principal Book of Won-Buddhism (Wonbulgyo chongjon). Translated by Robert E. Buswell Jr., Nak-chung Paik (Seoul National University) and Young Don Choi (Korea University), on behalf of the Department of Edification of Won-Buddhism. Iksan: Won Kwang Publishing Co. 179 pp.
 1996: Abhidharma Buddhism to 150 A.D. Encyclopedia of Indian Philosophies, vol. 7. Delhi: Motilal Barnarsidass. Coeditor (with P. S. Jaini and Noble Ross Reat) and contributor; Karl H. Potter, Editor. 636 pp.
 1992: The Zen Monastic Experience: Buddhist Practice in Contemporary Korea. Princeton: Princeton University Press. 245pp

 1992: Paths to Liberation: The Marga and its Transformations in Buddhist Thought. Coeditor (w/ Robert M. Gimello) and contributor. Studies in East Asian Buddhism series, no 7. Honolulu: University of Hawaii Press, A Kuroda Institute Book. 525pp
 1991: Tracing Back the Radiance: Chinul's Korean Way of Zen. Classics in East Asian Buddhism, no. 2. Honolulu: University of Hawaii Press, A Kuroda Institute Book. 232pp (Paperback abridgment of The Korean Approach to Zen).
 1990: Chinese Buddhist Apocrypha. Editor and Contributor. Honolulu: University of Hawaii Press. 338pp.
 1989: The Formation of Ch'an Ideology in China and Korea: The Vajrasamadhi-Sutra, A Buddhist Apocryphon. Princeton: Princeton University Press. 315 pp.
 1983: The Korean Approach to Zen: The Collected Works of Chinul. Honolulu: University of Hawaii Press. 468 pp.

Published articles
For a list of Buswell's published articles please see http://international.ucla.edu/media/files/Buswell-CV.pdf

Honors
In 2009, Buswell was awarded the Manhae Grand Prize from the Chogye Order in recognition of his pioneering contributions to Korean Buddhist Studies in the West. He is also a recipient of the Puri Prize for Buddhist Studies in Korea.

References

External links
 Page at UCLA Department of Asian Languages & Cultures' web site for Robert E. Buswell https://www.alc.ucla.edu/person/robert-e-buswell/
 Buswell's translation "Cultivating Original Enlightenment" http://muse.jhu.edu/books/9780824862084/
 Buswell's "Sugi's "Collation Notes" to the Koryŏ Buddhist Canon and Their Significance for Buddhist Textual Criticism" from the Journal of Korean Studies 

American Buddhist studies scholars
Koreanists
University of California, Los Angeles faculty
American Buddhists
Year of birth missing (living people)
Living people
Buddhism in Korea